A list of films produced in Pakistan in 1975:

1975

See also
1975 in Pakistan

External links
 Search Pakistani film - IMDB.com

1975
Pakistani
Films